The 1963–64 NBA season was the 76ers 15th season in the NBA and 1st season in Philadelphia.

Roster

Regular season

Season standings

x – clinched playoff spot

Record vs. opponents

Game log

Playoffs 

|- align="center" bgcolor="#ffcccc"
| 1
| March 22
| @ Cincinnati
| L 102–127
| Greer, Kerr (21)
| Red Kerr (15) 
| Paul Neumann (8) 
| Cincinnati Gardens6,238
| 0–1
|- align="center" bgcolor="#ccffcc"
| 2
| March 24
| Cincinnati
| W 122–114
| Hal Greer (29)
| Red Kerr (15)
| Hal Greer (7)
| Municipal Auditorium4,510
| 1–1
|- align="center" bgcolor="#ffcccc"
| 3
| March 25
| @ Cincinnati
| L 89–101
| Chet Walker (21)
| Red Kerr (19)
| Hal Greer (5)
| Cincinnati Gardens7,171
| 1–2
|- align="center" bgcolor="#ccffcc"
| 4
| March 28
| Cincinnati
| W 129–120
| Hal Greer (22)
| Ben Warley (15) 
| Hal Greer (8)
| Municipal Auditorium4,255
| 2–2
|- align="center" bgcolor="#ffcccc"
| 5
| March 29
| @ Cincinnati
| L 124–130
| Red Kerr (31)
| Red Kerr (11)
| Hal Greer (6)
| Cincinnati Gardens7,913
| 2–3
|-

Awards and records 
Hal Greer, All-NBA Second Team

References 

Philadelphia 76ers seasons
Philadelphia
Philadel
Philadel